Switzerland competed at the 2022 Winter Paralympics in Beijing, China which took place between 4–13 March 2022. In total, 12 athletes competed in four sports.

Medalists

The following Swiss competitors won medals at the games. In the discipline sections below, the medalists' names are bolded.

Competitors
The following is the list of number of competitors participating at the Games per sport/discipline.

Alpine skiing

Théo Gmür was among the alpine skiers to represent Switzerland at the 2022 Winter Paralympics.

Men

Cross-country skiing

Luca Tavasci competed at the 2022 Winter Paralympics.

Men

Snowboarding

One snowboarder, Romy Tschopp, represented Switzerland.

Banked slalom

Snowboard cross

Qualification legend: Q - Qualify to next round; FA - Qualify to medal final; FB - Qualify to consolation final

Wheelchair curling

Switzerland competed in wheelchair curling.

Summary

Round robin

Draw 1
Saturday, March 5, 14:35

Draw 2
Saturday, March 5, 19:35

Draw 4
Sunday, March 6, 14:35

Draw 6
Monday, March 7, 9:35

Draw 8
Monday, March 7, 19:35

Draw 9
Tuesday, March 8, 9:35

Draw 11
Tuesday, March 8, 19:35

Draw 13
Wednesday, March 9, 14:35

Draw 15
Thursday, March 10, 9:35

Draw 16
Thursday, March 10, 14:35

See also
Switzerland at the Paralympics
Switzerland at the 2022 Winter Olympics

References

Nations at the 2022 Winter Paralympics
2022
Winter Paralympics